Balone Beach is a hamlet in the Canadian province of Saskatchewan.

Demographics 

References

Designated places in Saskatchewan
Hoodoo No. 401, Saskatchewan
Organized hamlets in Saskatchewan
Division No. 15, Saskatchewan